Oedura gemmata, also called the jewelled velvet gecko or dotted velvet gecko, is a gecko endemic to Northern Territory in Australia.

They normally measure 50 cm long head to tail. They live in the Northern territory of Australia, they like to live in rocky places.

References
   

Oedura
Reptiles described in 1983
Taxa named by Max King (herpetologist)
Taxa named by Graeme Francis Gow
Geckos of Australia